Clube Desportivo Mafra is a Portuguese football club, currently playing in the Liga Bwin. They are based in the town of Mafra and own Campo Doutor Mário Silveira stadium, but the games are played in Estádio Municipal de Mafra. Founded in 1965, the club predominantly played within Portugal's regional leagues where they gradually worked their way up until they won the Associação de Futebol de Lisboa Division 1 title in the 1991–92 league season and promotion to the national leagues.

Appearances

LigaPro: 2 (as of the 2018–19 season)
Segunda Divisão/Campeonato Nacional: 17
Terceira Divisão: 8

Season to season
2000/01: Terceira Divisão: 3rd
2001/02: Terceira Divisão: 1st
2002/03: Segunda Divisão B: 2nd
2003/04: Segunda Divisão B: 8th
2004/05: Segunda Divisão B: 2nd
2006/07: Segunda Divisão: 7th
2007/08: Segunda Divisão: 5th
2008/09: Segunda Divisão: 7th
2009/10: Segunda Divisão: 5th
2010/11: Segunda Divisão: 2nd
2011/12: Segunda Divisão: 6th
2012/13: Segunda Divisão: 2nd
2013/14: Campeonato Nacional: 1st
2014/15: Campeonato Nacional: 1st
2015/16: Segunda Liga: 21st Relegated
2016/17: Campeonato Portugal Prio
2017/18 Campeonato Portugal Prio: 1st Champions
2018/19: Segunda Liga

Current squad

Honours
Campeonato de Portugal: 2014–15, 2017–18
Terceira Divisão: 2001–02
Associação de Futebol de Lisboa Division 1: 1991–92
Associação de Futebol de Lisboa Division 2: 1975–76
Associação de Futebol de Lisboa Division 3: 1970–71

References

External links
Official site 
Club Profile at ForaDeJogo 
Club Profile at Soccerway.com
Club Profile at Zerozero

Football clubs in Portugal
Association football clubs established in 1965
1965 establishments in Portugal
Liga Portugal 2 clubs
Sport in Mafra, Portugal